Voice of the Beehive are an Anglo-American alternative pop rock band formed in London in 1986. 

The group featured Californian lead vocalist sisters Tracey Bryn and Melissa Brooke Belland (daughters of The Four Preps singer Bruce Belland). They teamed with British musicians Mike Jones, Martin Brett, Mark Bedford and Daniel Woodgate, the latter two of whom were former members of Madness. Bedford left after making formative contributions to the band and did not feature again, while Woodgate stayed for most of the band's main period of activity. The band took their name from the Greek meaning of the name Melissa, meaning honey bee.

Career 
The band had five Top 40 singles from two albums in the UK. Their biggest commercial success came with the singles "I Say Nothing", "Don't Call Me Baby", "Monsters and Angels" and "I Think I Love You", taken from albums Let It Bee and Honey Lingers. Sex & Misery, a third album, was released in 1996; by this point sisters Tracey and Melissa were the sole group members. The band reformed in 2003 to play a two-week UK tour.

The members of Voice of the Beehive have gone their separate ways. Tracey Bryn is a teacher in Laguna Beach, California. Melissa Belland runs her own company Made in Heaven, also in Laguna Beach. Martin Brett runs Brett Dempsey Music Productions in London and joined I, Ludicrous on bass guitar in 2008. In 2011, he released his first solo single "Lover's Lane" under his original punk name Brett Martini. He also trained to become a facial hair specialist for film, theatre, and television in 2010. Daniel "Woody" Woodgate still plays drums, together with Mark Bedford on bass, in Madness. Mike Jones lives in Norwich, England and still plays guitar.

In October 2017, Bryn and Belland reformed with the original line-up to play a pair of concert dates in London, including the '80s/'90s revival show Indie Daze 4.

Band members 
 Tracey Bryn – guitar and vocals – (born 17 May 1962, Encino, California)
 Melissa Brooke Belland or "Missy Beehive" – vocals – (born 17 February 1966, Los Angeles, California)
 Mark Bedford – bass guitar
 Martin Brett (Brett Martini) – bass guitar
 Mike Jones – guitar
 Daniel "Woody" Woodgate – drums

Discography

Albums

Studio albums

Live albums

Compilation albums

Video albums

EPs

Singles

Other appearances
Voice of the Beehive provided harmonies on Bill Drummond's album, The Man (1986).

An early version of "Beat of Love" was featured on the London Records compilation Giant (1987).

Melissa and Tracey contributed a cover of "Five Feet High and Rising" to the Johnny Cash tribute album Til Things Are Brighter (1988), credited as "Tracey & Melissa Beehive"

In 1993, Voice of the Beehive contributed a cover version of "Gimme Shelter" with Jimmy Somerville to an EP released to raise funds for the Putting Our House in Order homeless initiative.  The single, which contained different duet versions of the song on each format, peaked at No. 23 in the UK, and No. 214 in Australia.

Notes

References

External links 
The Beehive—Voice of the Beehive Online 
Voice of the Beehive at Myspace

Voice of the Beehive 1992 interview with Maynard (broadcaster)
Melissa Belland Instagram

English pop rock music groups
English alternative rock groups
London Records artists
Musical groups from London
Musical groups established in 1986
Musical groups disestablished in 1996
1986 establishments in England
Female-fronted musical groups